Pathum Rat is a district (amphoe) in the southwestern part of Roi Et province, Thailand.

Geography 
Neighboring districts are (from the east clockwise): Kaset Wisai of Roi Et Province; Phayakkhaphum Phisai, Na Dun, and Wapi Pathum of Maha Sarakham province.

History 
The minor district (king amphoe) was created on 15 June 1963, when three tambons, Bua Daeng, Phon Sung, and Non Sawan were split off from Kaset Wisai district. It was upgraded to a full district on 27 July 1965.

Economy 
The district's economy is agricultural. The area is known for its hom mali rice. It is the district's OTOP (One Tambon One Product) product.

Although the district, has no sugar cane cultivation, Banpong Sugar Company plans to build a sugar mill in the district to process about 24,000 tons of sugarcane a day. The facility is to be powered by sugarcane residue. Banpong Sugar belongs to the Banpong Group, the seventh largest Thai sugar-milling group, with mills in Phetchaburi and Kamphaeng Phet. It held 4.2% of the Thai sugar market in 2017.

Administration

Central administration 
The Pathum Rat district is divided into eight sub-districts (tambons), which are further subdivided into 101 administrative villages (mubans).

Local administration 
There are three sub-district municipalities (thesaban tambons) in the district:
 Pathum Rat consisting of parts of sub-districts Bua Daeng and Non Sa-nga.
 Phon Sung consisting of sub-district Phon Sung.
 Non Sawan consisting of sub-district Non Sawan.

There are six sub-district administrative organizations (SAO) in the district:
 Bua Daeng consisting of parts of sub-district Bua Daeng.
 Dok Lam consisting of sub-district Dok Lam.
 Nong Khaen consisting of sub-district Nong Khaen.
 Sa Bua consisting of sub-district Sa Bua.
 Non Sa-nga consisting of parts of sub-district Non Sa-nga.
 Khilek consisting of sub-district Khilek.

References 

Phathum Rat